Rat Island is an island off the coast of Western Australia. It is a part of the Easter Group of the Houtman Abrolhos.

References 

Islands of the Houtman Abrolhos